Astrid Carøe Rasmussen (born 7 July 1994 in Copenhagen) is a Danish politician and member of the Folketing for the Socialist People's Party. She was elected into parliament in the 2019 general election.

Background
Carøe is the daughter of agronomists Henrik Rasmussen and Anita Carøe Henningsen.

Political career
Carøe ran for municipal council in Sorø Municipality in the 2013 local election. She received 199 personal votes, just 24 votes less than Linda Nielsen, who was the Socialist People's Party's other candidate. Nielsen gained the seat in the municipal council. Carøe did not run again in the 2017 local election.

Carøe was elected into parliament in the 2019 general election, where she received 2,550 personal votes.

External links 
 Biography on the website of the Danish Parliament (Folketing)

References 

Living people
1994 births
Socialist People's Party (Denmark) politicians
Members of the Folketing 2019–2022
Women members of the Folketing
21st-century Danish women politicians
Politicians from Copenhagen
Members of the Folketing 2022–2026